DMPS may be an acronym for:

 2,3-Dimercapto-1-propanesulfonic acid (DMPS), a chelating agent
 Des Moines Public Schools, a school district based in Des Moines, Iowa

See also
DMP (disambiguation)